Long Slow Exhale is an American women's basketball drama television series created by Pam Veasey for Spectrum Originals and BET. From Paramount Television Studios, Veasey executive produced alongside her former L.A.'s Finest collaborators Anton Cropper and Jon Dove, bringing the trio back to Spectrum after the Bad Boys spinoff served as their first scripted originals foray. Cropper also directed the series. Also executive producing were Bruna Papandrea and Casey Haver for Made Up Stories. The series premiered April 4, 2022 and was canceled after one season in June 2022.

Premise 
A competitive women's college basketball team head coach, J.C. Abernathy, finds herself in a potentially career-ending sexual abuse scandal. As she tries to find the truth among the many secrets she uncovers, she has to make hard decisions that will affect her, her family and the team of female athletes who all rely on her.

Cast and characters

Main 
 Rose Rollins as J.C. Abernathy, Head Coach
 Josh Lucas as Hillman Ford, Athletic Director of the university
 Ian Harding as Eddie Hagan, Assistant Coach
 Lyriq Bent as Garrett Carter, J.C.'s husband
 Shalini Bathina as Emily Fisk, Associate Head Coach
 Enajite Esegine as Jordan Malone
 Brittney Elena as Corrine Porter
 Jazmine Stewart as Verdell
 Isabella Star LaBlanc as Elfrina
 Carmen Flood as Nikki Dessandro
 Erin Croom as Lorna Avery

Recurring 
 Famke Janssen as Dr. Melinda Barrington, Chancellor of the university
 Samantha Bartow as Shannon Crawford, the star three-pointer on the Clayton Hall Cougars
 Brent Sexton as Arlin Swayne, a former Atlanta police officer
 Tony Gonzalez as Desmond, Corrine's father, a former professional football player and Clayton Hall superstar
 Jaiden Kaine as Deputy Belmont
 Gabrielle Byndloss as Vivian, J.C.'s assistant
 Enya Flack as Jillian Porter, Corrine's step-mother
 Melissa Saint-Amand as Claire Brockman
 Britt Rentschler are Rachel Fleming
 Betsy Borrego as Jessica Owens
 Anabella Raye as Kate Ford

Episodes

Production 
The show was announced on February 9, 2021, with the cast announcement of Rose Rollins. There would be twelve episodes in the series. The series, from Paramount Television Studios, would launch first on Spectrum and then on BET after nine months. It was noted that this windowing strategy "is a way to split the costs of producing high-end scripted fare during a time in which many media companies are focusing less on linear networks."

The show was in development/pre-production in Atlanta, GA. It was reported that filming would begin in Atlanta in March.

Josh Lucas was announced on February 19, 2021. Jeff Schine was announced on March 4, 2021 but due to scheduling conflicts, he was replaced by Ian Harding as announced on March 24, 2021. Famke Janssen was announced on March 9, 2021. Lyriq Bent, Shalini Bathina, and the series regulars and recurring cast were also all announced on March 24, 2021. Melissa Saint-Amand was announced on August 4, 2021.

References

External links 
 

2020s American drama television series
2022 American television series debuts
2022 American television series endings
Television series by Paramount Television
Television series by Made Up Stories
Spectrum Originals original programming
BET original programming